Mineral County is a county in the U.S. state of West Virginia. It is part of the Cumberland, MD-WV Metropolitan Statistical Area. As of the 2020 census, the population was 26,938. Its county seat is Keyser. The county was founded in 1866.

History

Ancient history

Indigenous peoples lived throughout the highlands along rivers in this area for thousands of years.  Archeologists have identified artifacts of the Adena culture, dating from 1000 BC to 200 BC. They were among the several early Native American cultures who built major earthwork mounds for ceremonial and burial use. Remnants of their culture have been found throughout West Virginia. They were followed by other indigenous peoples.

With the growth of fur trading to the north after European encounter in the coastal areas, the nations of the Haudenosaunee (or Iroquois Confederacy), based in present-day New York, moved into the Ohio Valley in search of new hunting grounds. By the 17th century they had conquered other tribes, pushed them out to the west, and preserved the area for hunting.

1863 to present
It was not until after West Virginia became a state in 1863 that present-day Mineral County was organized. It was created in 1866 by an Act of the West Virginia Legislature from the existing Hampshire County. The name was selected due to its reserves of minerals, especially coal - although coal, a type of sedimentary rock, is not a mineral because it does not have a crystalline structure.

The seminal point in the creation of the county was the arrival of the main line of the Baltimore and Ohio Railroad in 1842. The county seat of Keyser was named for an executive of the railroad.

In 1863, West Virginia's counties were divided into civil townships, with the intention of encouraging local government.  This proved impractical in the heavily rural state, and in 1872 the townships were converted into magisterial districts.  After its formation in 1866, Mineral County was divided into seven townships: Cabin Run, Elk, Frankfort, Mill Creek, New Creek, Piedmont, and Welton.  Mill Creek Township was returned to Hampshire County in 1871, and in 1872 the six remaining townships became magisterial districts.  Except for minor adjustments, they remained relatively unchanged until the 1980s, when they were consolidated into three new districts: District 1, District 2, and District 3.

Geography

Mountains
The northern terminus of the Allegheny Front in West Virginia lies in Mineral County and includes the highest point in the county. From the abandoned fire tower four states are visible, Pennsylvania, Maryland, West Virginia, and Virginia. The Allegheny Front is the largest mountain in the county; on the north end it is also known as Green Mountain. On top of the Allegheny Plateau is located the town of Elk Garden, West Virginia in the southwestern portion of the county. The Potomac River Valley lies to west and north of the mountain, and the New Creek Valley lies to the east.

Knobly Mountain lies between the New Creek and Patterson Creek valleys. It is the longest mountain in Mineral County stretching from the Grant County line in the south to the Potomac River in the north at Ridgeley, West Virginia.

To the east of the Patterson Creek Valley lie a series of low hills which form the eastern border of the county with Hampshire County.

Rivers
North Branch Potomac River is the largest river, though not actually in the county. It forms the northern border of the county and the state border with actual border being the low water mark on the south side.  Jennings Randolph Lake is located on this stream.
New Creek enters the North Branch Potomac River at Keyser with the headwaters starting at Dam Site 14 in Grant County, West Virginia. It is the water supply for the city of Keyser.
Patterson Creek enters the Potomac River east of Cumberland, Maryland with headwaters being in Grant County, West Virginia. The Patterson Creek watershed contains two-thirds of Mineral County.

Minerals
Natural gas is found east of the Allegheny Front as well as iron ore deposits. The county no longer produces iron, but several abandoned iron furnaces from the 19th century still exist.

Demographics

2000 census
As of the census of 2000, there were 27,078 people, 10,784 households, and 7,710 families residing in the county. The population density was 83 people per square mile (32/km2). There were 12,094 housing units at an average density of 37 per square mile (14/km2). The racial makeup of the county was 96.16% White, 2.55% Black or African American, 0.11% Native American, 0.20% Asian, 0.01% Pacific Islander, 0.21% from other races, and 0.76% from two or more races. 0.58% of the population were Hispanic or Latino of any race.

There were 10,784 households, out of which 30.40% had children under the age of 18 living with them, 57.90% were married couples living together, 9.70% had a female householder with no husband present, and 28.50% were non-families. 25.00% of all households were made up of individuals, and 11.50% had someone living alone who was 65 years of age or older. The average household size was 2.46 and the average family size was 2.93.

In the county, the population was spread out, with 23.40% under the age of 18, 8.60% from 18 to 24, 27.10% from 25 to 44, 25.90% from 45 to 64, and 15.10% who were 65 years of age or older. The median age was 39 years. For every 100 females there were 95.80 males. For every 100 females age 18 and over, there were 93.00 males.

The median income for a household in the county was $31,149, and the median income for a family was $37,866. Males had a median income of $32,337 versus $20,090 for females. The per capita income for the county was $15,384. About 11.50% of families and 14.70% of the population were below the poverty line, including 21.10% of those under age 18 and 11.60% of those age 65 or over.

2010 census
As of the 2010 United States census, there were 28,212 people, 11,550 households, and 7,879 families residing in the county. The racial makeup of the county was 95.3% white, 2.8% black or African American, 0.4% Asian, 0.1% American Indian, 0.1% from other races, and 1.2% from two or more races. Those of Hispanic or Latino origin made up 0.7% of the population. In terms of ancestry, 32.9% were German, 16.0% were Irish, 11.3% were English, and 10.0% were American.

Of the 11,550 households, 28.5% had children under the age of 18 living with them, 53.5% were married couples living together, 10.0% had a female householder with no husband present, 31.8% were non-families, and 27.0% of all households were made up of individuals. The average household size was 2.39 and the average family size was 2.87. The median age was 42.3 years.

The median income for a household in the county was $36,571 and the median income for a family was $46,820. Males had a median income of $44,068 versus $25,675 for females. The per capita income for the county was $20,805. About 11.7% of families and 16.1% of the population were below the poverty line, including 25.2% of those under age 18 and 12.7% of those age 65 or over.

Politics
After having leaned strongly towards the Democratic Party between the New Deal and Bill Clinton's presidency, most of West Virginia has, since 2000, seen a swing towards the Republican Party due to declining unionization and differences with the Democratic Party's liberal views on social issues. Mineral County, in contrast, was formed from the Unionist portion of Hampshire County following the Civil War and has always leaned Republican, although it has never been nearly so rock-ribbed as analogously-created Grant County. Nonetheless, Mineral County would not vote Democratic between 1888 and 1932 inclusive – although voting for Theodore Roosevelt in 1912  – and the last Democrat to carry the county was Jimmy Carter in 1976.

Government

County Commission
Mineral County is governed by a three-member commission, one member to be elected every two years to a six-year term of office. The County Commission, as the governing body, is responsible for the fiscal affairs and general administration of county government. The County Commission does not possess home rule per Article 6, Section 39a of the Constitution of West Virginia.

Commissioners
Jerry Whisner, Republican Commission President: term ending 2016
Roger Leatherman, Republican: term ending 2020
Richard Lechliter,  Republican: term ending 2018

Appointed commissions
The Mineral County Planning Commission is charged with administering Mineral County's land use ordinances. It operates under section §8A-2-1 of the West Virginia state code. Its subdivisions include Industrial Park Construction, Storm Water Management, and Flood Plain Management. Members are appointed to the planning commission, by the county commission, for 3 year terms.
The Mineral County Development Authority administers industrial parks and seeks to bring new business to the county. Current Executive Director, Kevin Clark

Office of Assessor
Assessor: Jill Cosner, Republican.

Circuit Clerk
Krista Dixon

County Clerk
The Clerk is elected to a six-year term with the right to succeed himself/herself. The primary duties and responsibilities of the Clerk of the County Commission may be identified as two basic functions:
 to act as clerk (fiscal officer, secretary) of the County Commission, and
 to act as the receiver of fees charged for the instruments to be filed and recorded within the county. The official books and papers of the Office of the Clerk of the County Commission are considered permanent public records.

The County Commissions through their clerks shall have the custody of all deeds and other papers presented for record in their counties and they shall be preserved therein. They shall have jurisdiction in all matters of probate, the appointment and qualification of personal representatives, guardians, committees, curators and the settlement of their accounts. The Clerk shall have custody of all election records, payroll and budgetary accounting, and accounts payable.

County Clerk: Lauren Ellifritz, Republican

State Representatives

House of Delegates

Senate

Economy

Industrial parks
The Mineral County Development Authority operates industrial parks near Keyser, featuring rail access, and near Fort Ashby, with fiber optics and sitewide wireless Internet Keyser Industrial Park Fort Ashby Business and Technology Park

Education
The school district for Mineral County is Mineral County Schools.

High schools
Mineral County Schools includes two high schools: Frankfort High School located near Short Gap and Keyser High School located south of Keyser.

Colleges
Potomac State College, a two-year school, is located in the county seat of Keyser, West Virginia on the site of Civil War Fort Fuller.

Eastern West Virginia Community & Technical College holds classes at Mineral County -- Technical -- Technical Center.

Transportation

Airport
The Greater Cumberland Regional Airport is located in Wiley Ford.

Public Transportation
The Potomac Valley Transit Authority provides deviated fixed route and demand response public transportation services to residents.

Rail
CSX lines run along the Potomac River on the northern border of the county. Amtrak service is available in Cumberland, Maryland, just across from Ridgeley, West Virginia. Keyser's railroad station closed in the 1980s.

Major highways

 U.S. Route 50
 U.S. Route 220
 West Virginia Route 28
 West Virginia Route 42

 West Virginia Route 46
 West Virginia Route 93
 West Virginia Route 956

Parks and public recreational attractions

Larenim Park
Includes two pavilions with 10 tables, an amphitheater with seating capacity of 600. One Little League field and one softball field. Fishing Areas; two flood control dams stocked by WVDNR,  . All  are open to public hunting by permit. Approximately 5 miles of trails. An arboretum is under construction at Larenim to include a Shale Barrens Conservancy. Larenim Park is also home to the local theater group, McNeill's Rangers.

Barnum Whitewater Area
Includes  of rail/trail. It is one of the best trout streams in West Virginia and also provides  of whitewater rafting and canoeing for the entire family to enjoy. Public hunting permitted on surrounding state lands.

MINCO Park
Its facilities include two pavilions with 50 picnic tables, nine cabins, a dining field, a chapel, meeting room, and bath/shower facilities.

Van Myra Campground
Three picnic tables, four mini-pavilions, and picnic area only comprise this facility.

Dam Site #21
Owned by Mineral County, with no facilities. Fishing  flood control dam.

Jennings Randolph Lake
Howell Run Picnic Area overlooks the lake and contains 40 picnic sites, two pavilions, a playground and vault toilets. The Howell Run Boat Launch consists of a two lane concrete ramp. the Robert W. Craig Campground is situated on a high ridge overlooking the dam site and features 87 campsites, potable water, hot showers, vault toilets and a playground. A 3/4 mile long interpretive trail has been developed in the area. The West Virginia Overlook area contains a two tier Visitor Center. Waffle Rock, a unique natural rock formation, can also be viewed from the Overlook.

Golf courses
Polish Pines – Privately owned, nine holes, Club House
Mill Creek – Privately owned, nine holes, Club House

Libraries 
Mineral County is home to the Keyser-Mineral County public library. It was a product of the Works Progress Administration and opened in 1937. In 1962 in moved to a larger location, in the building formerly occupied by the Farmers and Merchants bank. The library is funded by the West Virginia Library Commission, Mineral County Court, and Keyser City Council. In addition to the main branch in Keyser, the library also has branches in Burlington and Fort Ashby.

Communities

City
Keyser (county seat)

Towns
Piedmont
Ridgeley
Carpendale
Elk Garden

Magisterial districts
District 1
District 2
District 3

Census-designated places
Burlington
Fort Ashby
Wiley Ford

Unincorporated communities

Antioch
Atlantic Hill
Barnum
Beryl
Blaine
Champwood
Claysville
Cross
Dans Run
Emoryville
Foote Station
Forge Hill
Fountain
Hampshire
Hartmansville
Headsville
Keymont
Laurel Dale
Limestone
Markwood
Nethkin
New Creek
Oakmont
Patterson Creek
Reeses Mill
Ridgeley
Ridgeville
Rocket Center
Russelldale
Short Gap
Skyline
Sulphur City
Wagoner

Historical sites

Notable people

 Colonel James Allen
 John Ashby
 Woodrow Wilson Barr
 Thomas Carskadon
 Henry G. Davis
 Thomas Beall Davis
 Lynndie England
 Henry Louis Gates
 Nancy Hanks Lincoln, mother of Abraham Lincoln
 Jonah Edward Kelley
 John Kruk
 Leo Mazzone
 Catherine Marshall
 Walter E. "Jack" Rollins
 Harley Orrin Staggers, Sr.
 Harley "Buckey" Staggers, Jr.
 Ken Ward Jr.
 Steve Whiteman

See also
 Allegheny Wildlife Management Area
 Mineral Daily News-Tribune - local newspaper
National Register of Historic Places listings in Mineral County, West Virginia

Footnotes

References

 
1866 establishments in West Virginia
Populated places established in 1866
West Virginia counties on the Potomac River
Counties of Appalachia